The British Government and Jihad (Urdu:Government Angrezi Aur Jihad) is a book written in 1900 by Mirza Ghulam Ahmad, the founder of the Ahmadiyya movement in Islam. An alternative title is the True Meaning of Jihad. It was published on 22 May 1900
and was translated into English in 2006, by Islam International Publications.

The Founder of the Ahmadiyya Muslim Jamaat refers to the Qur'an and the Ahadith (sayings) of the Islamic prophet Muhammad in order to explain the true nature of the Islamic concept of jihad. The author points to the peaceful nature of the Islamic faith and explains that Muhammad resorted to defensive war only after suffering thirteen years of brutal oppression. Divine permission to retaliate was granted for the specific purpose of self-defense, to punish aggressors, and to uphold freedom of conscience. He also argues that the command to fight and retaliate was for that specific condition in which the early Muslims found themselves.

Opposition to God’s messengers
The author explains why a new messenger of God finds such a great opposition from the pre-existing communities and their religious leaders. He believes it is out of anger and jealousy and the fear that their incomes shall go down if the new message and reformation succeeded. He writes, the new reformer unmasks the deficiencies of their leaders. He claims, for similar reasons the pagans, Christian and Jewish communities and their leaders strongly opposed the Islamic Prophet Muhammad and his community. He writes, “members of this faction are in fact deficient; they possess very little of Divine light and their flaws are totally exposed during a Prophet or Messenger’s time. Their egos give rise to hostility towards God’s Prophets and the righteous, and they selfishly devise plans to injure them." (The British Government and Jihad, p. 5)

Ahmad believes, the existing Arab communities, “feared that the firm establishment of this religion would in turn sow the seeds of destruction for their faith and nation.” (p. 6) and it was the main reason behind the Muslim community was so strongly opposed and acts of extreme “cruelty and brutality were committed against them”.

Trials and tribulations 

Ahmad states, "For a lengthy thirteen year period” the Muslim community suffered extreme oppression but they were instructed, not to retaliate. “the streets ran red with their blood, they did not utter a sound. They were slaughtered like animals but did not protest.” (p. 7). He writes, "They were trampled underfoot but did not utter a sound.” Ahmad describes the extreme torture which the Muslim community suffered.

God's permission to retaliate

Ahmad discusses in reference to the verse 22:39 of the Quran, "Permission [to fight] has been given to those who are being fought, because they were wronged. And indeed, Allah is competent to give them victory". (p. 7). He believed this was the verse that described the real philosophy of Jihad.

Command to fight specific to that time period

Mirza Ghulam Ahmad believed, this  Command (Quran 22:39) to retaliate and fight was specific to the time period of the Prophet and the prevailing circumstances only: He writes:

Medieval Muslim Jurists Erred 
The author is of the opinion that failure to comprehend the true import of this verse, the early Muslim jurists and scholars committed profound error, and shed the blood of innocent human beings in the name of Holy War or Jihad. This belief appears unique among the past Muslim jurists.

Today's Muslim scholars

The author of the treatise believes that present day religious scholars (Maulavis) are entirely misguided in comprehending the true philosophy of Jihad and they keep preaching such dangerous and blood-spattered doctrines among the ignorant Muslims, which have become the cause of extremism and violence in the society. He writes, " Maulavis who persist in propagating these blood-spattered doctrines are in fact responsible for murders committed by ignorant, egotistical people who know nothing of why Islam was forced to fight battles in its early history".(p. 9)

Mualavis and Christian priests

Commenting upon the then prevalent "Jihadist" movements among the Indian Muslims Mirza Ghulam Ahmad holds responsible, besides the Maulavis, the Christian priests, who incited the ignorant masses of the Muslim society, about the misguided concept of Jihad. He writes:

Ahmad writes the Christian missionaries have also spread this misguided belief of Jihad by distributing provocative literature in Urdu, Pashto and other languages, to preach the false views that "Islam was spread by the sword".(p. 11) This in a way served as a combined testimony of the Maulavis and Christian Missionaries, to incite people to violent acts and create unrest.

Why Act XXIII of 1867 failed

Commenting upon the failure of Act Number XXIII of 1867, in order to check the spread of the
militant ideas of the Frontier's residents, Ahmad believed it was due to the continued provocative and bitter writings of priests like Imad ud-din Lahiz of Amritsar and some other foul-mouthed priests who greatly damaged goodwill and reconciliation within the country.

A dangerous course
Ahmad saw a great danger in the combined Testimony of the Christian Missionaries and Maulavis who spread a violent view of the Muslim concept of Jihad. At the same time he perceived the dangerous consequences of the naive strategy of the Christian clergy and wrote:

What should the government do

To suggest a remedy to the British Government in India (1900) Ahmad advised a three-step policy, which will greatly control the poisonous growth of envy and spite, among the various strata of the Indian society:

Hypocrisy of Maulavis
Ahmad, has admonished the Muslim scholars (Maulavis) to shun hypocrisy. He believed when, "they meet present day rulers, they bow down as if ready to prostrate; but among their own kind they insist repeatedly that this country is “dar-ul-harb” [the zone of war]. They consider jihad to be obligatory in their hearts, and few of them think otherwise" (p. 11). He advised the Maulavis restore true sincerity. He believed if they pondered over the Quran and Ahadith, they may realize the truth.

This is not the time for Jihad

The author of the book, Mirza Ghulam Ahmad who claims to be the promised Messiah admonished the Muslims in very strong words, telling this was not the time for Jihad i.e. any kind of armed combat:

The Messiah admonishes

He writes, I as the promised Messiah admonish you:

I came to end religious wars

I have come to you with an order: jihad with the sword has ended from this time forward, but the jihad of purifying your souls must continue. I do not say this of my own accord. This is indeed the will of God. Recall the hadith from Sahih al-Bukhari which honours the Promised Messiah by saying yada-‘ul-harb. That is to say, when the Messiah comes he will put an end to religious wars. (p. 18)

The tradition prevalent among Muslims of attacking the people of other religions, which they call jihad, is not the jihad of Divine religious Law [Shari‘ah]. Rather, it is a grievous sin and a violation of the clear instructions of God and His Prophet. It may not be easy for certain Muslims to abandon this custom since it is well established among some tribes. p. 21)

Advice to Amir of Kabul

Ahmad also addressed the Amir of Kabal   to "convene a discussion on the true nature of jihad. These religious scholars can then educate the public about its errors." (p. 22) Thus spreading a more peaceful and better understanding of Jihad among the people of Afghanistan. For Ahmad believed "it is mostly Afghans who commit these acts and wield the sword with the intent of becoming ghazis, and a sizable majority of them live in his country. These barbaric practices defame Islam and he should do his best to cleanse the Afghan nation of them." (p. 23)

Afghanistan will suffer
Probably Ahmad knew, the Amir of Kabal was not going to pay heed to any of his councils, so he warned the Afghans of bitter consequences of their extremism:

Claims to be the Messiah and Mahdi
At the end of the booklet, Ahmad has put forth his claim to Divine Relation, and that he was the promised Messiah and Mahdi:

"Did this age not need the avatar [second coming] of Jesus the Messiah? Of course it did.
Currently, millions of Muslims are ready to kill other people under the pretense of jihad. Indeed, some are unable to truly love a benevolent government even while living under its
protection. They are unable to reach the highest levels of sympathy, and cannot cleanse themselves of affectation and pretence. There was therefore a dire need for the avatar of the
Messiah. So I am that very promised avatar, who has been sent in the spiritual likeness, personality and temperament of Jesus the Messiah". (p. 33)

My message will spread

God has Himself provided the means for fulfilling His prophecy that the message of the Messiah will spread in the world like lightning and will encompass all four corners of the earth like the light from a tower. The railways, telegraph, steamships, excellent postal services, easy modes of travel and tourism and other such means have been established to fulfill the prophecy that the message of the Messiah will illuminate every corner like lightning. (p. 19)

References

External links
Government Angrezi Aur Jihad (The British Government and Jihad)

British Government and Jihad
Jihad
1900 non-fiction books
20th-century Indian books
Indian religious texts